Sonja Vectomov (born 21 May 1979) is a Czech-Finnish electronic musician and composer who descends from a family rooted in the classical music world. Vectomov is married to American writer and conductor David Woodard. Her parents are Vladimír Večtomov and Sonja Vectomov.

Education
In the early 2000s Vectomov studied at Norwich University of the Arts, where she was awarded a Bachelor of Arts with Honours degree in 2005.

Career
Her grandfather Ivan Večtomov, also a composer, was a cellist with the Czech Philharmonic for 22 years, and her uncle was the cellist Saša Večtomov.

Concomitantly she monitored the electronic music scenes in Finland and England.

As a solo artist Vectomov's concerts sometimes involve elements of installation, e.g., the transformation of a stage into a salon. She has stated that Conlon Nancarrow and David Byrne are important influences.

Lamprophrenia
The title of Vectomov's experimental debut album is her self-coined portmanteau of the New Latin / Greek words lampron (bright) and phrenia (mind). The album features electronic compositions with vocals, and is considered unpredictable and "full of unexpected twists and turns."

The first single "Two in One," for which Mika Johnson directed a music video featuring prima ballerina Jana Andrsová, "recounts a story of death and transfiguration, interspecies karma and plant consciousness—this maiden release from Lamprophrenia pulses with nucleopatriphobic synthesizer rhythms, violin, viola, harmonica, mandolin and the consummate intonements of Vectomov."

Miscellaneous
Like both of her parents, Vectomov is a pedagogue. She has designed and taught music workshops for at-risk youths and disadvantaged Romani children in Kutná Hora, Czech Republic.

Vectomov makes a cameo appearance in H*art On, Andrea Culková's 2016 documentary film about the virtually unknown early 20th century writer Milada Součková and her husband, Devětsil-era painter Zdeněk Rykr.

References

External links

Official website
Uneventful Records, Sonja Vectomov
Sonja Vectomov, "Two in One" (YouTube), 2016, 3:34 min.

1979 births
Living people
Czech women
Musicians from Hradec Králové
Czech classical musicians
Czech expatriates in Finland
Finnish classical musicians
Finnish electronic musicians
Alumni of Norwich University of the Arts